Daniele Amati (born 11 August 1931, in Rome) is an Italian theoretical physicist, specializing in particle physics.

Education and career
Amati received in 1952 from the University of Buenos Aires his Ph.D. in physics under Richard Gans with a thesis on ferroresonant circuits. In 1953–1954 Amati was a fellow at the Centro Brasileiro de Pesquisas Físicas in Rio de Janeiro, where he took several graduate courses, including one taught by Richard Feynman. From 1954 to 1959 Amati was an assistant at the University of Rome. Afterwards he was in the theory department of CERN and from 1973 to 1975 its director. Since 1986 he has been a professor at and, until 2001, director of the Scuola Internazionale Superiore di Studi Avanzati (SISSA). SISSA not only deals with physics but also with cognitive science and biology and is close to the International Center for Theoretical Physics (ICTP) located near Trieste. Under the auspices of SISSA, Springer Nature publishes the purely electronic Journal of High Energy Physics, founded by Amati in 1997. In the early to mid-1970s, Amati made the theory group at CERN a center of early string theory development, which was initiated as a result of a dual-resonance model by Gabriele Veneziano at CERN in 1968. Among CERN's theory group, Victor Alessandrini in 1971 and Claud Lovelace in 1970 published on the multiloop amplitudes of the bosonic string. Amati's 1989 article with Ciafaloni and Veneziano has over 1000 citations.

Selected publications
 as editor with John Ellis:  Quantum Reflections , Cambridge University Press, New York 2000, .

References

External links

 (photo from CERN Theory Group Picnic in 1976 — photo donated by J. David Jackson)

1931 births
Living people
University of Buenos Aires alumni
People associated with CERN
Italian string theorists
Italian expatriates in Argentina